"Let's Go to Bed" is a song by English rock band the Cure, released as a stand-alone single by Fiction Records in November 1982. In the aftermath of the dark Pornography, Robert Smith returned from a month-long detox in the Lake District to write the song, the antithesis to what the Cure currently represented. It was later included on the album Japanese Whispers, which compiles the band's three singles from 1982-83 and their five B-sides.

The single was only a minor success in the UK, peaking at No. 44, but became a Top 20 hit in Australasia in 1983, reaching No. 15 in Australia (for two weeks) and No. 17 in New Zealand.

History
The origins of "Let's Go to Bed" lie in "Temptation", one of the demos for Pornography. The song is a relatively upbeat, guitar-driven instrumental. In August 1982, soon after Simon Gallup's departure from the band, Smith demoed a vocal version of the track, entitled "Temptation Two", a psychedelic piece not far removed from the Pornography album but somewhat lighter in tone. At the end of the song, Smith sings a string of wordless syllables, nearly identical to the "doo doo doo"s of the later song. The song version was debuted on Kid Jensen's radio show on 27 November 1982, as a take which was very close to the final version that appeared as a single in the same month.

In an interview with Rolling Stone, Robert Smith discussed the initial reaction when playing the song to Fiction Records:  However, the song became a success much to Smith’s surprise. 

On 15 March 1983, the song was the first broadcast for the pioneering Boston-based alternative rock radio station WFNX. When WFNX was sold and ceased broadcasting on 20 July 2012, "Let's Go to Bed" was selected as the station's final broadcast.

Reception
AllMusic described the song as "antic, herky-jerky new wave pop", while Pitchfork called it "bratty, funky synthpop".

Music video
The song's music video was the band's first collaboration with Tim Pope, who would go on to direct several more videos for the group. The video features members Robert Smith and Lol Tolhurst, who at that point were the only members of the Cure – the only instance in the band's history where the band officially had a two-person lineup. Pope’s video treatment displayed the band’s more whimsical side, something absent from the band’s early work. In his book, Tolhurst also recalls that he was dancing naked behind the screen as a shadowy silhouette.

Track listing
7-inch vinyl
 "Let's Go to Bed" – 3:35
 "Just One Kiss" – 4:10
12-inch vinyl
 "Let's Go to Bed" (Extended Mix) – 7:04
 "Just One Kiss" (Extended Mix) – 7:02
US 7-inch vinyl
 "Let's Go to Bed" – 3:34
 "Boys Don't Cry" – 2:36
US 12-inch vinyl
 "Let's Go to Bed" – 7:45
 "Just One Kiss" – 7:18
 "Let's Go to Bed" (edit) – 3:35

Personnel 
 Robert Smith – vocals, guitar, bass, keyboards
 Lol Tolhurst – keyboards
 Steve Goulding – drums

Charts

Weekly charts

Year-end charts

References

External links
 

The Cure songs
1982 singles
Ivy (band) songs
Songs written by Robert Smith (musician)
Music videos directed by Tim Pope
Songs written by Lol Tolhurst
Fiction Records singles
1982 songs